Ann Griffiths (née Thomas, 1776–1805) was a Welsh poet and writer of Methodist Christian hymns in the Welsh language. Her poetry reflects her fervent Christian faith and thorough scriptural knowledge.

Biography

Ann was born in April 1776 near the village of Llanfihangel-yng-Ngwynfa,  from the market town of Llanfyllin in the former county of Montgomeryshire (now in Powys). She was the daughter of John Evan Thomas, a tenant farmer and churchwarden, and his wife, Jane. She had two older sisters, an older brother, John, and a younger brother, Edward.

Not far away lay Pennant Melangell, where Saint Melangell had lived as a hermit in the 6th century.

Ann was brought up in the Anglican church. In 1794, her mother died when she was 18, and about that time or perhaps earlier she followed her brothers John and Edward in being drawn to the Methodists. In 1796 she joined the Calvinistic Methodist movement after hearing the preaching of Benjamin Jones of Pwllheli.

After the deaths of both her parents, she married Thomas Griffiths, a farmer from the parish of Meifod and an elder of the Calvinistic Methodist church. However, she died after childbirth in August 1805, at the age of 29, and was buried on 12 August 1805 at Llanfihangel-yng-Ngwynfa.

Ann Griffiths left a handful of stanzas in the Welsh language. These were preserved and published by her mentor, the Calvinistic Methodist minister, John Hughes of Pontrobert, and his wife, Ruth, who had been a maid at Ann Griffiths' farm and was a close confidante.

Poetry
Ann's poems express her fervent Christian faith and reflect her incisive intellect and thorough scriptural knowledge. She is the most prominent female hymnist in Welsh. Her work is regarded as a highlight of Welsh literature, and her longest poem  (Wondrous, wondrous to angels...) was described by the dramatist and literary critic Saunders Lewis as "one of the majestic songs in the religious poetry of Europe".

Her hymn Wele'n sefyll rhwng y myrtwydd is commonly sung in Wales to the tune Cwm Rhondda.

The service of enthronement of Rowan Williams as Archbishop of Canterbury in February 2003 included Williams' own translation of one of her hymns: "Yr Arglwydd Iesu (The Lord Jesus)".

Legacy
Together with Mary Jones (1784–1864), a poor Welsh girl who walked to Bala to buy a Bible, Ann Griffiths became a national icon by the end of the 19th century, and was a significant figure in Welsh nonconformism.

The Ann Griffiths Memorial Chapel in Dolanog, Powys, is named after her and has a carved corbel head based on contemporary descriptions of her. There are stained glass windows in her memory in Eglwys y Crwys Welsh Presbyterian Church, Cathays, Cardiff, in the Williams Pantycelyn Memorial Chapel in Llandovery, and in the Ceiriog Memorial Institute in Glyn Ceiriog.

The television channel S4C commissioned Ann!, a musical based on Ann Griffiths' life, to be performed at the 2003 National Eisteddfod at Meifod. This was later televised and released on CD.

References

Further reading
A. Griffiths, Cofio Ann Griffiths, ed. G. M. Roberts (1965)
A. M. Allchin, Ann Griffiths, Writers of Wales series (Cardiff: University of Wales Press, 1976)
E. Wyn James, "Cushions, Copy-books and Computers: Ann Griffiths (1776–1805), Her Hymns and Letters and Their Transmission", Bulletin of the John Rylands Library, 90:2 (Autumn 2014), pp. 163–183. ISSN 2054-9318
H. A. Hodges (ed. E. Wyn James), Flame in the Mountains: Williams Pantycelyn, Ann Griffiths and the Welsh Hymn (Tal-y-bont: Y Lolfa, 2017), 320 pp. . This contains the texts of Ann Griffiths' hymns in the original Welsh, with translations of her hymns and letters into English.
E. Wyn James, 'Remember these Welsh heroines' (letter), Western Mail, 8 January 2019
E. Wyn James, "Popular Poetry, Methodism, and the Ascendancy of the Hymn". In: The Cambridge History of Welsh Literature, ed. Geraint Evans & Helen Fulton (Cambridge: Cambridge University Press, 2019)

The standard edition of her hymns and letters is E. Wyn James (ed.), Rhyfeddaf fyth . . . (Gwasg Gregynog, 1998).

External links

Ann Griffiths Website

1776 births
1805 deaths
18th-century hymnwriters
19th-century hymnwriters
18th-century Methodists
19th-century Methodists
18th-century Welsh poets
19th-century Welsh poets
18th-century Welsh women writers
19th-century Welsh women writers
Deaths in childbirth
Welsh-language poets
Welsh Methodist hymnwriters
Welsh women poets
Converts to Methodism from Anglicanism
Welsh Methodists
British women hymnwriters
Calvinistic Methodists